MoneyHunt is a reality-based television program that allowed entrepreneurs to
pitch their ideas to a panel of experts and receive candid feedback on improving
their presentations. The format, created by Miles Spencer and Cliff Ennico, was
considered a seminal work of the dot-com era that broke ground on several fronts.
Produced by MoneyHunt Properties, Inc. the program was distributed to American
public television stations in the US and several markets overseas from 1997 to 2004.

Format
MoneyHunt developed several format processes that were unique for their time to produce the show. MoneyHunt was distributed on public television, which had never aired business content in this format. The show sourced candidates through online auditions, which were a unique use of the then-burgeoning World Wide Web. Eventually, MoneyHunt added a series of live events produced in conjunction with regional venture conferences to screen test candidates. The show was hosted by presenters with no on-camera experience, but significant domain expertise. It was produced to simulate a real venture pitch and was "live to tape" so most blunders and pauses were often kept in the final cut for dramatic effect. The show offered cash prizes in the form of an investment in the best contestants.

Co-Hosts Miles and Cliff opened the program with a brief greeting and soon introduced the first guest, who was waiting off stage. Like a business meeting, Miles or Cliff greeted the guest and welcomed them to the table. A MoneyHunt Mentor joined each show, adding specific domain expertise to the questioning. Each guest had 8 minutes to detail key categories, helped along by quick paced questions from the hosts and mentor. These included:
 Product
 Market
 Competition
 Management
 Money
 Uses

The final segment was the review session, where the pitches of each guest weredebated and awarded thumbs up or down. Beginning in Season Six, MoneyHunt began awarding a cash award as convertible debt (leaving the pricing of the equity to subsequent investors).

Hosts
 Miles Spencer and Cliff Ennico first met working on small equity financings in their home state of Connecticut. Ennico was and remains an attorney focused on new business formation and financing. Spencer had been a banker and venture capitalist prior to the program's development, and has gone on to become a successful digital media entrepreneur and angel investor. Neither had ever appeared in front of a live camera, but their unique rapport and natural communication skills were deemed preferable to on camera talent without start-up business domain expertise.

History
MoneyHunt was first conceived at a continuing education class in Greenwich CT. Spencer and Ennico, as quoted in the jacket of their co-authored book, credit an unknown student with suggesting "you guys should to a radio show or something because your insight is really helpful for entrepreneurs". The two immediately began testing formats that might fit within a 30-minute show and have some sort of "payoff" at the conclusion.

MoneyHunt was first taped at cablevision's public access studios in Norwalk CT in
1996 for a fee of $500 per night. By 1997 the tape made it into the hands of two
TV professionals: Scott Carlin (then VP of Distribution at Warner Brothers TV) and
Deborah Ely. Within three months, MoneyHunt premiered on Public Television
at WHYY (Philadelphia) in 1998 while the dot.com boom was beginning to draw
interest to the startup subject. The first MoneyHunt Mentor was Jerry Yang of
Yahoo!. The unique set was designed by Studio 210 of Norwalk, CT and featured
several unique elements. The guests entered through a carousel door with a giant
compass, and were seated in front of a giant clock face and were shot from a camera
hidden behind a coin (three elements of the MoneyHunt Logo). A video screen with
web access was used to view websites and B-roll about the companies. The hosts authored a book MoneyHunt 27 Rules with fictionalized accounts of business stories and pointers for appearing on the show, published by HarperCollins.

 MoneyHunt produced six original seasons from 1997 to 2001 and was sponsored by MasterCard, Yahoo!, PriceWaterhouseCoopers, Register.com, and Excite. The show was slotted as primarily a Sunday morning show and typically ran next to weekly news wrap up shows on roughly 130 Public Television Stations. This slotting was unique in that it was never designed as a prime time show, and the resulting product was regarded as more intellectual than subsequent efforts at the format.
The format was licensed overseas and ran in markets including: Italy, Spain, and China.

MoneyHunt was originally formed in 1996 as the marketing arm of a small venture
capital firm, Capital Express that included Miles Spencer as a partner. Capital
Express benefitted from the deal flow of so many emerging companies appearing on
the show.  MoneyHunt was subsequently spun off into an independent entity in 1997.
By 2000 MoneyHunt was no longer producing new episodes and the library and
rights were sold to a prior licensee, Fact Based Communications ("FBC") of Rome,
Italy. They have since been repurchased.

References

1997 American television series debuts
2004 American television series endings
1990s American reality television series
2000s American reality television series
Television shows set in Connecticut